S Club 7 are an English pop group from London, created by former Spice Girls manager Simon Fuller and consisting of members Tina Barrett, Paul Cattermole, Jon Lee, Bradley McIntosh, Jo O'Meara, Hannah Spearritt, and Rachel Stevens. The group was formed in 1998 and quickly rose to fame by starring in their own BBC television series, Miami 7. In their five years together, S Club 7 had four UK number-one singles, one UK number-one album, and a string of hits throughout Europe as well as a Top 10 hit on the US Hot 100, with their 2000 single "Never Had a Dream Come True". They recorded four studio albums, released 11 singles and went on to sell over 10 million albums worldwide.

The concept of the group was created by Simon Fuller who signed them to Polydor Records. Their show lasted four seasons and saw the group travel across the US, eventually ending up in Barcelona. It became popular in 100 countries where the show was watched by over 90 million viewers. The show, a teen sitcom, often mirrored real-life events which had occurred in S Club, like the relationship of Spearritt and Cattermole, and Cattermole's departure from the group. S Club 7 won two BRIT Awards—in 2000 for British breakthrough act and in 2002, for best British single. In 2001, the group earned the Record of the Year award. Cattermole departed in 2002, citing "creative differences", and the group name dropped the "7". Their penultimate single reached number five in the UK charts and their final album failed to make the top ten. Following Cattermole's departure, the group fought many rumours presuming that they were about to split. On 21 April 2003, during a live onstage performance, S Club announced that they were to disband.

In 2014, the original lineup reunited for a UK tour in 2015 before disbanding again to pursue other endeavours. In 2023, the band announced that they had reunited for an arena concert tour beginning in October that year to mark 25 years since their formation.

In the years after the full original lineup of S Club 7’s disbandments, each member went on to each achieve individual success elsewhere in the entertainment industry with some members forming the spin-off group S Club Allstars (originally "S Club 3") performing their hits in venues across the UK.

History

1997–1998: Formation
Simon Fuller has commented that he came upon the concept of S Club 7 the day after he was fired by the Spice Girls in November 1997, with the new group meant as a "continuation" of the latter. He selected the members for the group after auditioning from over 10,000 hopefuls; Rachel Stevens was the only member of the group who did not audition to gain admittance into the group. Instead, two producers from 19 Management approached her and asked her to go into the studio to record a demo tape for Fuller. Both Jo O'Meara and Paul Cattermole were spotted by producers from 19 and asked to audition. After the auditions had been advertised in The Stage, Jon Lee, Hannah Spearritt, Tina Barrett and Bradley McIntosh auditioned. After some final adjustments, including the removal of three original members, S Club 7 was formed.

Once the final line-up was decided, they flew to Italy to become acquainted with each other. Speaking about this first meeting, Stevens remarked that the group "felt comfortable with each other from the beginning". Several members of the group have since stated that the "S" in S Club 7 stands for Simon, after the group's creator, although the official line has always been ambiguous. The group's entry on the Popjustice website states that at one point they were nearly called "Sugar Club" instead of the name that stuck. Another theory is that the group is so-named because  "S" is the first letter of the word "seven". McIntosh, in a December 2012 interview, said a lot of Simon Fuller's success has been based on the number 19 (owning 19 Entertainment); therefore, as "S" is the 19th letter of the alphabet, the "S" was put into S Club 7.

1999–2000: S Club television series 

S Club 7 first came to public attention in 1999, when they starred in their own television series, Miami 7. The show first aired on CBBC on BBC One and was a children's sitcom based on the lives of the group who had moved to Miami, Florida in search of fame in America. The show was also launched in the United States, airing on Fox Family, and later on ABC Family; it was retitled S Club 7 in Miami for American audiences. The show eventually celebrated worldwide success and was watched by 90 million viewers in over 100 countries. The group also filmed two specials between the first two series of their show. The first, Back to the '50s—which aired on CITV, instead of CBBC—told the story of how the group found themselves back in 1959. In the second TV special, Boyfriends & Birthdays, Stevens' boyfriend gave her an ultimatum of staying with him or remaining with S Club.

Within the television series, and the parallel branding, each member of S Club 7 had their own character, which contained exaggerated forms of their real life counterparts as well as their own identifiable "S Club colour". Hannah Spearritt, for example, had an "S Club colour" of yellow which, as Spearritt describes, mirrors her own interesting personality: "bright and happy". US media characterized S Club 7 as "The Monkees for the next generation". Joel Andryc—the vice president of the Fox Family Channel—stated that Miami 7 is "far more relationship driven" than The Monkees, and that "kids today are more sophisticated".

Following on from Miami 7, S Club 7 released the theme music to the show as their debut single on 9 June 1999. The up-tempo "Bring It All Back" reached number-one in the United Kingdom singles charts, and after selling more than 600,000 copies, was made BPI certified Platinum. Commenting on the chart position of "Bring It All Back", the group felt "nervous and on-edge" before they discovered they had reached number one. Once they had received the phone call from the record company, the group celebrated the news with "cheers, shouting and crying". The group's success escalated and much like Fuller's marketing campaign for the Spice Girls, they were set to become a "marketable commodity". As evidence for this, global toy manufacturer Hasbro agreed upon an exclusive licensing agreement with 19 Management which included worldwide rights in the fashion doll category; singing S Club 7 dolls were later released onto the market. An official magazine, fan club, and accompanying Miami 7 scrapbook were also launched furthering 19 Management's corporate aim.

Over the course of the year, the group enjoyed more success in the charts after their second single, "S Club Party", entered the UK charts at number-two and went straight to number-one in New Zealand. Their third single was a double A-side and featured the ballad, co-written by Cathy Dennis, "Two in a Million" and retro-styled, up-tempo "You're My Number One". The former was the first single where O'Meara took leads vocals, setting the standard for future S Club 7 releases; the single also reached number-two in the UK charts. Following the success of their television show and released singles, the group released their debut album S Club in October 1999. The album quickly rose to number-two in the UK charts, and then became certified Double Platinum. The album consisted of a variety of styles including motown and salsa tracks.

Due to the increasing demand for the group with gruelling schedules including spending over thirteen weeks in America filming the first series of their show and their subsequent television specials, the members often felt that the travelling back and forth from the UK and the US was "perhaps more tiring than what we were actually going out to America to do". Paul Cattermole once commented that the speed of the schedule sometimes caused a "kind of dreamscape in your head", as the group often felt "jetlagged and tired". On top of the filming schedules, the group often performed at high-profile pop music festivals such as Party in the Park where they performed for 100,000 fans. The intensity of the schedule would be a constant battle for the group and was going to continue to take its toll for all the years S Club 7 were together. In spite of this, the group always remained in solidarity that they were all good friends, "cared for each other a lot" and supported each other through difficult times in the group.

2000–2001: 7

In February 2000, the group won the 'British Breakthrough Act' award at the 2000 BRIT Awards. In April 2000, S Club's second TV series, L.A. 7 (renamed S Club 7 in L.A. in the US), was released. The series saw the group depart from Miami and move to Los Angeles to seek a record deal. It introduced the song "Reach", another retro-styled uptempo track, which was co-written by Cathy Dennis and aired as the main theme tune to the second series. "Reach" was released as a single in May 2000 and reached number-two in the UK charts. It arguably became one of the group's most successful singles, paving the way for the group's second album, 7 which was released on 12 June 2000. This album was a departure from the overtly pop stylings of S Club, with tracks styled more towards R&B than the traditional nineties pop sound of their debut album. It reached number-one in the UK charts becoming certified Triple Platinum, and a certified Gold record in the US. The second single from the album, "Natural", featured Stevens as lead vocalist. It reached number three in September 2000.

S Club 7 took an active part in promoting several charities during their time as a band. As well as performing for Children in Need, the band launched, on 25 September 2000, a new television series called S Club 7 Go Wild!, which saw each band member support an endangered species. Teaming up with the World Wildlife Fund, each member travelled to different destinations worldwide with a hope to raise awareness about the seven endangered creatures, including the Siberian tiger and the hyacinth macaw. In October 2000, they launched the annual Poppy Appeal Campaign with Dame Thora Hird and supported Woolworth's Kids First Campaign throughout 1999 and 2000. The group also recorded vocals for "It's Only Rock 'N' Roll", which raised money for Children's Promise, an alliance of seven children's charities: Barnardo's, Children in Need, ChildLine, The Children's Society, Comic Relief, NCH and the NSPCC. A cover of The Rolling Stones song, the group contributed to the vocals alongside many popular artists, including Mary J. Blige, Natalie Imbruglia and the Spice Girls; it entered the UK charts at number-nineteen. Also, during that time they filmed two TV specials: Artistic Differences and their Christmas Special.

In November 2000, S Club 7 were invited to provide the official song for the UK's BBC Children in Need Campaign 2000, so a new song, the ballad "Never Had a Dream Come True", was recorded. The song became popular in the US market eventually taking the group to appear on MTV's TRL to perform the song, and it was also included on the US release of Now That's What I Call Music. After topping the UK charts in December 2000, the song was added to a re-release of the 7 album, along with another new track, a cover of Stevie Wonder's "Lately".

2001–2002: Sunshine and Cattermole's departure

"Never Had a Dream Come True" had marked a more mature direction for the group whilst still retaining their pop sensibilities, a direction which continued into their third studio album, Sunshine. The album contained what was to become one of S Club's most popular tracks, "Don't Stop Movin'". The song was released in April 2001, marked a high point for the group as the single went straight to number-one, went Platinum and became the seventh best selling single of 2001. McIntosh, who takes lead vocals with O'Meara in the track, said he was "nervous" about taking lead vocals and was worried how people would react. After the song went in at number-one, he felt as though he was "supported by the fans" and his fears were alleviated. McIntosh also remarked that the single had broken new ground for the group, and Cattermole thought it to be their "best song by miles". The group won the Record of the Year award for the song, and in February 2002, the single won the group their second BRIT Award for best British single. The song has since been covered by The Beautiful South for their 2004 album Golddiggas, Headnodders and Pholk Songs, as well as by Starsailor who recorded it for BBC Radio 1's Live Lounge.

By spring 2001, the group were "desperate" to start touring; it was something which they had always wanted to do, but could not because things were "always so hectic". After spending most of early 2001 rehearsing, the S Club Party 2001 tour began on 19 May 2001. Describing the tour, Stevens remarked that seeing a crowd of over 13,000 fans each night coming to see them was "such an unbelievable feeling", and the other members of the group shared an "adrenaline rush" as well as a wave of emotion before going on stage. Once the tour was over, the group had to fly back to the United States in order to film the third series of their television show, Hollywood 7. This third series, which was still set in Los Angeles, was the group's favourite to film because they had more acting experience and could "drop their shoulders" and start to enjoy themselves. The group had to continuously cope with intense schedules and early starts whilst recording for the programme, something which, although the group felt "laid back" about at the time, was to eventually take its toll and lead to the demise of the band. Hollywood 7 began airing in September 2001 and dealt with the issue of an on-screen kiss between Spearritt and Cattermole, who had begun dating in real life. Their relationship, which was kept secret for six months, was well received by the band who claimed it had made them all closer as friends. Hollywood 7 aired alongside a new CBBC reality show, S Club Search, which invited children to extend the S Club brand and audition to form a younger version of the band. The new group were to be chosen to sing with S Club 7 on Children in Need 2001 and go on tour with them on their future S Club 7 Carnival 2002 tour. The eight children who went on to form the band named themselves S Club Juniors and had six top-ten UK hits.

The effects of the group's charity single, "Never Had a Dream Come True", were felt when the group handed over £200,000 to Children in Need, from the sales of the CD after the release of "Don't Stop Movin'" in April 2001. As a result, S Club 7 were invited back and asked to record a second consecutive Children in Need single, in November 2001. It was decided that "Have You Ever", a song co-written by Chris Braide and Cathy Dennis, was to be released for the charity campaign. After the success of the previous year's single, the performance on the night featured many primary school children who had pre-recorded their own versions of the chorus, including the S Club Juniors, who made their first television appearance. The band felt "overjoyed" that they could, once again, contribute to the Children in Need campaign, feeling that it meant a lot to them to be involved and feeling privileged to be able to help; they also commented that it was nice for British school children to be involved in raising money for charity. The single was another success for the group and became their fourth number one, as well as the 21st biggest selling single of 2001.

In January 2002, S Club 7 embarked upon their second arena tour, S Club 7 Carnival 2002, which aimed to please fans by stylising their songs to fit with a carnival-like theme with music styles from different countries of the world. Speaking about the tour, McIntosh described it as "older show", a change from S Club Party 2001, which was "more like bubblegum", with Cattermole comparing 2001's "theatrical" tour with the Carnival tour as a more "glitzy, concert stage". The tour was generally well received by the children's media, describing the show as "diverse" and "dazzling", whereas the group was criticised by the broadsheets as being "like a compilation of toddler-friendly Eurovision entries" although conceding that it was a "slick, decent-value show". Cattermole was also criticised when he was dubbed overweight and a "heavy-footed dancer". After the success of their last three singles, all of which had made it to number-one, S Club 7 failed to top the charts when they released their ninth single, "You"; it reached number-two in the UK. The single, which was described as a "candyfloss-bright, tongue-in-cheek 50s pastiche", was to be Cattermole's last single with the band and led the way for a series of events that was to unravel S Club 7's time at the top of the charts, which would ultimately cause the band to split.

Talking about his former musical venture three months before he left S Club 7, Cattermole described his school nu metal band – called Skua – as having a "Limp Bizkit vibe" as well as comparing their style to Rage Against the Machine. Cattermole's resignation came as Skua had decided to reform, and he found it a perfect time to make the transition back from pop to rock as S Club 7's record contracts were up for renewal. Skua released their first album in October 2014 titled Kneel. Cattermole stayed with the band until June 2002, featuring in four out of thirteen episodes of the group's final television series, Viva S Club, and performing his final concert with the group for Party at the Palace, which was part of Queen Elizabeth II's Golden Jubilee celebrations.

2002–2003: Film, Greatest Hits and break-up

After Cattermole's departure, vowing to not disband, the remaining six members stayed together under the name S Club. Despite losing a member of the group, the future remained positive as, although they were very sad to see Cattermole leave the group, they were "delighted" to have extended their contracts meaning they could look forward to new material, a new series of their television show as well as their first feature film. Media reports of the time weren't so optimistic stating that, as neither the Spice Girls nor Take That had survived once they lost a member of their group, it would be difficult for S Club to remain together in an industry which has a "horrible habit of leaving bands in tatters once the first member has left". After only peaking at number-five in the UK charts with "Alive", their first single as a six, was S Club's optimism diminished. Although their progressive musical style was once again furthered with the release of their fourth studio album, Seeing Double, it failed to make an impact on the UK charts, stalling at number-seventeen. S Club's time at the top of the charts was slowly coming to an end, and when O'Meara announced that she had an immobilizing back condition which could have left her in a wheelchair, and she was unable to take part in television performances, the group was left devastated.

In April 2003, S Club released their first feature film, Seeing Double, directed by music-video director Nigel Dick, which was to be the last time the group would be seen on-screen together. Unlike its television predecessors, the film moved into the realm of children's fantasy, and saw the group fighting evil scientist Victor Gaghan in his quest to clone the world's pop stars. The film's release was marked by many rumours that the group were about to split, which were quickly denied by the six. There was also controversy when the band had to travel economy class to America and when Fuller did not turn up for the premiere of the film. On 27 April 2003, it was reported that Spearritt's parents had hired lawyers to chase payments owed to them by Simon Fuller and his management company. They claimed that out of the €75 million fortune the band made for Fuller, they only received €150,000 a year of it.

Ten days after the release of their movie, the rumours were confirmed when it was announced live on stage—during their S Club United tour on 21 April 2003 – that, after a final single and greatest hits album, S Club would part ways. The band cited a mutual split, expressing it was simply a time "to move on and face new challenges". The members of S Club have commented on how exhausting being in the band was, due to hectic schedules and long filming days. Spearritt has remarked that the group had felt it appropriate wanting to do their own thing; she had constantly felt "drained" whilst with S Club. The fans felt "betrayed" and "disappointed" by the breakup, as well as "angry" due to the group denying rumours only two weeks before at the Seeing Double premiere. Many compared the demise of the group to that of fellow pop band Steps, as they too had denied their intentions until the moment before their split, after which they were accused of acting out of "greed and cynicism". The final single was a double A-side, coupling "Love Ain't Gonna Wait for You", from their fourth album Seeing Double, with a new ballad, "Say Goodbye", released on 26 May. The single reached number-two in the UK, beaten to the top spot by R. Kelly's "Ignition (Remix)". On 2 June it was released on their greatest hits album, Best: The Greatest Hits of S Club 7. This compilation brought together the group's releases with a previously unreleased track, "Everybody Get Pumped" and 7 track "Bring the House Down". The album reached number-two in the United Kingdom. On 8 June the group made their last appearance together on Top of the Pops.

2014–2015: Original line-up reunion
In August 2014, it was reported that the band would be reforming under the backing of Simon Fuller. Cattermole denied these reports the next day, but said a reunion was "God damn close to happening". On 22 October, it was confirmed that all seven members of S Club 7 would reunite for the BBC Children in Need telethon; the reunion aired on 14 November 2014, with S Club 7 performing a medley of four of their greatest hits: "S Club Party", "Reach", "Bring It All Back" and "Don't Stop Movin'". On 17 November 2014, S Club 7 announced their plans for an arena reunion tour, promptly titled Bring It All Back 2015, which toured the UK in May 2015.

In March 2015, during an interview with Graham Norton on BBC Radio 2, the group confirmed plans to re-release their 2003 greatest hits, Best: The Greatest Hits of S Club 7 that forthcoming May, and that it may contain the previously unreleased track "Rain". On 28 April 2015, it was confirmed that the re-issue of the Best album would release on 4 May, and would include "Rain", as well as "Friday Night" from the S Club album.

2023: Second reunion
On 10 February 2023, S Club's social media accounts announced that a major announcement would be made on The One Show on 13 February at 7 pm. Barrett, O'Meara and Stevens also made an appearance at the 2023 Brit Awards on 11 February, reminding viewers to tune in to find out what was happening.

On 13 February, the group revealed on The One Show that they were reuniting to go on tour for their 25th anniversary. The S Club 7 Reunited tour will begin at M&S Bank Arena in Liverpool on 13 October 2023 and culminate with a performance at The O2 Arena in London two weeks later. A second show at The O2 Arena on 27 October was added to the schedule following a huge demand for tickets during the pre-sale period. On 21 February 3 additional dates where added due to overwhelming demand. 

Confirming their reunion tour they said  "We can't even believe it's been so long, music and friendship have always been at the core of everything that we've ever done."

Controversies
On 20 March 2001, Cattermole, Lee and McIntosh were caught with cannabis in London's Covent Garden; they were cautioned by police at Charing Cross Police Station and released without charge. After the event, their publicity firm Henry's House released a public apology stating they were "very stupid" and "very sorry", admitting to having made a "stupid mistake". At the time, BT and Cadbury, who had sponsorship deals with S Club 7, said they were "very disappointed" to learn of the caution but said they would keep their contracts with the band. The Quaker Oats Company ended talks with 19 Entertainment after learning of the police caution. It was rumoured that merchandising company PMS International were to take out an £800,000 lawsuit against the band for declining sales as a direct result of the drugs scandal. This came to nothing and any doubts over the future of sponsorship ended when Pepsi signed the band up less than a month after the drugs caution.

Musical style

The style of music S Club 7 normally falls under is pop, or more specifically bubblegum pop. Their first two singles saw vocals shared equally amongst the seven members of the group, and it was not until their third single, Two in a Million", that O'Meara became known as their lead vocalist. Although the band were to progressively change their style over the four years they were together, even their first album had many tracks atypical of the pop genre: "You're My Number One" and "Everybody Wants Ya" were Motown-driven, whereas "Viva La Fiesta" and "It's a Feel Good Thing" were both "bouncy, salsa-driven Latino songs".

Over the years, their style and direction changed progressively with each new album. Their second album 7 had songs with styles that somewhat opposed the traditional pop songs that rival pop bands of the nineties were releasing. With the release of "Natural" in 2000, S Club 7 showcased a new R&B-lite sound. The release of their third album, Sunshine, gave audiences their biggest change: the album contained tracks such as the disco-influenced "Don't Stop Movin'" and the R&B ballad "Show Me Your Colours". The album marked a more mature approach for the band.

Following the departure of Cattermole, S Club released their fourth and final album, Seeing Double, including the single "Alive", which was called a "power-packed dance floor filler", a style similar to that of their final single, "Love Ain't Gonna Wait for You". The album contained dance tracks that varied from their original bubblegum pop stylings, such as the "sex for the CBBC generation" on "Hey Kitty Kitty", although one reviewer, referring to "Gangsta Love", said "S Club's spiritual home is the suburban disco, not urban underground clubs, and their attempt to go garage on "Gangsta Love" ends up amusing rather than authentic". Throughout their releases, S Club 7 retained the same pop style with songs such as "Reach", "You" and "Say Goodbye".

Awards and nominations

Members
Timeline

Discography

 S Club (1999)
 7 (2000)
 Sunshine (2001)
 Seeing Double (2002)

Filmography

{| class="wikitable sortable"
|+Film
! Year
! Title
! Roles
! Notes
|-
| 2002
| ''Don't Stop Movin| Themselves
| Documentary
|-
| 2003
| Seeing Double
| Acting as fictionalised versions of themselves
| Musical comedy film; continuation of Miami 7 storyline
|}

Concert toursHeadlining'''
 S Club Party Tour (2001–2002)
 Carnival Tour (2002)
 S Club United Tour with S Club Juniors (2003)
 Bring It All Back 2015 (2015)
 Reunited: 25th Anniversary Tour (2023)

References

 
1999 establishments in England
19 Recordings artists
Brit Award winners
English dance music groups

English pop music groups
Interscope Records artists
Musical groups established in 1998
Musical groups disestablished in 2003
Musical groups reestablished in 2014
Musical groups disestablished in 2015
Musical groups reestablished in 2023
Musical groups from London
Polydor Records artists
Teen pop groups